The Lowell Police Department (LPD) has the primary responsibility for law enforcement and investigation for a population of about 107,000 in the  city of Lowell, Massachusetts.  Lowell is the fourth-largest city in the Commonwealth of Massachusetts and is county seat of Middlesex County, Massachusetts. Raymond Kelly Richardson, a 30-year veteran of the department is the current superintendent of police. The department is a member of the North Eastern Massachusetts Law Enforcement Council, which provides specialized units throughout the region.

History

Like other urban American police forces, the Lowell Police Department was founded in the nineteenth century in response to rapid urbanization and industrialization. This brought an influx of immigrants in search of employment, increasing the city's population dramatically.

In the late 1990s, Superintendent of Police, Edward F. Davis implemented innovative "community policing" strategies, which reduced Lowell's crime rate faster than any other American city with over 100,000 residents. In 2006, he left Lowell to become the commissioner of the Boston Police Department. Kenneth Lavallee succeeded him, continuing the community policing approach and reaching out to community and youth groups.

In 2013, Deborah Friedl, although appointed temporarily, became the first woman chosen as police superintendent in the department's history.

Training Academy

The Lowell Police Department's Training Division has been in operation since 1996 and has conducted in-service training for police officers from 48 cities and towns. The Lowell Police Academy consists 50 classes over the course of 21 weeks. Student officers receive basic police training and must meet the standards established by the Massachusetts Police Training Committee (MPTC) to become a police officer. In 2010, the LPD moved its Training Division from the CrossPoint Towers to 99 Middlesex Street.The director of the Training Division is Captain James Hodgdon.

Operations
The Lowell Police Department is made up of 175 Police Officers, 30 Sergeants, 13 Lieutenants, 9 Captains, 2 Deputy Superintendent, and a Superintendent. Making a total of 230 sworn officers.

Rank structure

Superintendent (1)
Deputy Superintendent (2)
Captain (9)
Lieutenant (13)
Sergeant (30)
Police Officer (184)

Geographic responsibility
Through a strategic planning process known as Geographic Responsibility, as well as input from the people of Lowell, it was determined that Crime and Disorder could be most effectively fought with the presence of a constant officer in neighborhoods. This method also seemed to be the most logical thing for supervision and accountability of each officer. There was frustration experienced by both officers and residents regarding the ability of officers to investigate neighborhood crimes. It was determined that officers who have the knowledge of a specific area and a relationship with the residents were to be assigned there, where they could best police the area. With this assignment method it is hoped that officers and residents will become more readily acquainted and will be more helpful to each other. Geographic assignment, the final phase of the Reorganization of the LPD, commenced on 17 January 1999. The city has been divided into three sectors which is each commanded by a Captain who has overall responsibility for the administration, neighborhood problems and concerns, as well as the success of his/her sector.

Patrol Shifts
Platoon 1

Late Nights

Platoon 2

Day Shift

Platoon 3

Early Nights

Sectors 
Alpha

Acre, Centralville, Downtown, Pawtucketville

Bravo

Belvidere, Back Central, Highlands, Lower Highlands, Sacred Heard / South Lowell

K9 Unit
The Lowell Police Department currently has 3 K9 teams: Lt. Steven Gendreau and his Bloodhound named Hope; Officer Chris Hanson and his German Shepherd named Bossi; Officer Michael Bergeron and his German Shepherd Randy.  These K9's perform vital functions for the LPD such as: tracking, searching, and apprehension of criminal suspects, searching for missing persons and children, assisting patrol officers with the detection of various types of illegal drugs or contraband in vehicles, luggage, or packages, assisting other officers in crowd control, responding to assist police departments from area communities when they are in need of a K9, as well as many other functions.

Line of duty deaths

Since its inception, the Lowell Police Department has lost four police officers in the line of duty. In 1978, Officer Christos Rouses, was shot and killed while responding to a silent alarm at a local pharmacy. In 1980, there was a memorial depicting an officer with his hand on the right shoulder of a young child placed in his honor directly in front of Department headquarters at JFK Plaza. The memorial, which sits in the center of a fountain has the names of:
 Officer George F. A. Pearsall, killed by gunfire on 24 April 1957
 Officer Christos G. Rouses, killed by gunfire on 17 November 1978
 Officer Patrick F. Leavitt, died after a heart attack on 18 December 1941
 Officer John J. Winn, killed by assault on 3 May 1971

In popular culture
 The department plays a prominent role in the 2010 film The Fighter, an Academy Award-winning biographical sports drama about Lowell boxer Micky Ward and his brother Dicky Eklund. Shot in and around Lowell, Sergeant Mickey O'Keefe played himself in the film. 
 Multiple episodes of the Fox show Cops follow Lowell police officers while on duty.

See also

 List of law enforcement agencies in Massachusetts

References

External links
 Lowell Police Department

1830 establishments in Massachusetts
Government of Middlesex County, Massachusetts
Municipal police departments of Massachusetts
Organizations based in Lowell, Massachusetts
Organizations established in 1830